Niaz Bolagh (also Romanized as Nīāz Bolāgh and Neyāz Bolāgh; also known as Niyāz Būlāh) is a village in Lak Rural District, Serishabad District, Qorveh County, Kurdistan Province, Iran. At the 2006 census, its population was 369, in 72 families. The village is populated by Kurds.

References 

Towns and villages in Qorveh County
Kurdish settlements in Kurdistan Province